Florida's 16th Senate District elects one member of the Florida Senate. The district consists of parts of Hillsborough, Pinellas counties, in the U.S. state of Florida. The current Senator is Democrat Darryl Ervin Rouson.

List of Senators 
NOTE: The following Information was gathered from the Florida Senate website. Only records of senators from 1998-present are kept.

Elections 
NOTE: The following results were gathered from the Florida Department of State. Uncontested election results are not provided.

1990

1992

1994

2002

2006

2010

2012

2014

2016

2018

2022

References

Florida Senate districts